The women's lightweight boxing competition at the 2016 Olympic Games in Rio de Janeiro was held from 12 to 19 August at the Riocentro.
Estelle Mossely won gold beating Yin Junhua in the final. The bronze medals were awarded to Anastasia Belyakova of Russia and Mira Potkonen of Finland, the latter being the country's only medal at the 2016 games.

Schedule 
All times are Brasília Time (UTC−3).

Results

References

Boxing at the 2016 Summer Olympics
Women's events at the 2016 Summer Olympics
2016 in women's boxing